Vermont Route 131 (VT 131) is a  state highway in Windsor County, Vermont, United States. It starts at VT 103 in Cavendish and terminates at a junction with U.S. Route 5 (US 5) and VT 12 in the town of Weathersfield.

Route description 

VT 131 begins at an intersection with VT 103 in the Windsor County town of Cavendish on the shores of the Black River. VT 131 runs southeast from VT 103 along Main Street in Cavendish, paralleling local railroad tracks as the main west–east road through the community. The route bends northeast in the village, passing a long string of residences, turning east at Twentymile Stream Road. Now paralleling the Black River, the route continues east through Cavendish, reaching the commercial center at a junction with Mill Street.

At Mill Street, VT 131 turns northeast through another residential sector of Cavendish. The route winds northeast through Cavendish, reaching the hamlet of Whitesville, a small community at the junction of Whitesville and Carlton Roads with VT 131. The route soon reaches Cavendish Center, a small junction at Brook Road, where it bends along the Black River eastward before turning southeast along the river still. After running south, the route soon bends east through the woods of Cavendish. VT 131 and the river bend northeast then east and entering the town of Weathersfield. In the community of Downers, which VT 131 almost immediately enters, the route junctions with VT 106.

After VT 106, VT 131 bends northeast out of Downers, paralleling the North Branch of the Black River, reaching the hamlet of Amsden. After a couple turns, the route reaches Gulf Road, where it turns north again, running up a mountainside into a bend at Henry Gould Road. VT 131 then bends southeast, passing the other end of Gulf Road, soon reaching a junction with Weathersfield Center Road. Running down the hillside it climbed earlier, the route bends northeast into a diamond interchange with I-91 (exit 8) in Weathersfield. 

After I-91, VT 131 becomes a divided highway as it enters the hamlet of Ascutney, reaching a junction with US 5 and VT 12 just west of the Connecticut River and New Hampshire, where VT 131's right-of-way becomes NH 103.

Major intersections

References

External links

131
Transportation in Windsor County, Vermont